Ebenavia tuelinae is a gecko species of the genus Ebenavia that is native to te Comoro Islands.

References

External links

Ebenavia
Reptiles of the Indian Ocean
Reptiles described in 2018
Taxa named by Mark D. Scherz
Taxa named by Angelica Crottini